Volkach is a river of Bavaria, Germany.

See also
List of rivers of Bavaria

References

Rivers of Bavaria
Rivers of Germany